Phoenix Cars LLC, d.b.a. Phoenix Motorcars, is a developer of zero emission, all-electric vehicles (EV) based in Anaheim, California, United States, focused on the deployment of light- and medium-duty EVs into the fleet and transit markets. The company was founded in 2002 and became a wholly owned subsidiary of Al Yousuf LLC in 2009 and of EdisonFuture in 2020. Phoenix launched its all-electric 14-22 passenger shuttle bus with 100 mile range per charge in 2013. The bus is based on the versatile Ford E350/450 Series vehicle.

Restructuring and financing
On March 19, 2008, Phoenix Motorcars announced that it had completed a financing and restructuring, with Dubai, United Arab Emirates-Al Yousuf LLC, and Arlington, Virginia-based AES Corporation, as new investors, the departure of the Phoenix Motorcars’ original founders and the appointment of a new board of directors.

In mid-2010, Al Yousuf LLC closed on a deal with AES Corporation that enabled Phoenix Motorcars to become a wholly owned subsidiary of Al Yousuf LLC. This led to another restructuring of Phoenix Motorcars in less than 2 years, with the company switching its focus to its 3rd generation drive system targeted for buses and trucks on the Ford E350/E450 cutaway chassis.

Production

Zero Emission Utility Shuttle – ZEUS 
Phoenix launched its third product in 2013, an all-electric 14-22 passenger shuttle bus with 100-mile range per charge.

This product achieved California Air Resources Board (CARB) certification in July, 2014 in the 10,001–14,000 pound GVWR range. Along with its 100-mile range per charge, the ZEUS shuttle is capable of rapid charging via CHAdeMO or SAE standards.  As of 2020 they were working with a number of Southern California airports to replace shuttles with their Zeus model.

Electric Flatbed Truck 
Phoenix launched its electric Flatbed in 2015, which is also based on the Ford E350/450 Series, with 100 mile range per charge.

References

External links
Official Website

Electric vehicle manufacturers of the United States
Bus manufacturers of the United States
Motor vehicle manufacturers based in California
Truck manufacturers of the United States